The Scouting Book for Boys is a 2009 British drama-thriller film directed by Tom Harper, produced by Ivana MacKinnon, and written by Jack Thorne. It stars Thomas Turgoose, Holliday Grainger, Rafe Spall, Susan Lynch, Tony Maudsley, and Steven Mackintosh.

The film premiered internationally at the San Sebastián International Film Festival and domestically at the BFI London Film Festival. It was Harper's directorial debut, with the score is by his long-time collaborator Jack C. Arnold.

Plot

Fourteen-year-old David (Thomas Turgoose) is spending the summer hanging out with Emily (Holly Grainger), the only other teenager in his trailer park. When her mom, Sharon (Susan Lynch), loses custody, Emily refuses to live with her father and convinces David to help her hide in a cave. While he brings Emily supplies and keeps her secret, the police investigate her disappearance – and soon uncover Emily's relationship with her mother's boyfriend, Steve (Rafe Spall), igniting David's jealousy.

External links

 
 Wilding, Philip. "The Scouting Book For Boys." Empire.

2009 films
British independent films
Film4 Productions films
Pathé films
Films directed by Tom Harper
Films with screenplays by Jack Thorne
2000s English-language films
2000s British films